La Chapelle-Thémer is a commune in the Vendée department in the Pays de la Loire region in western France.

It is situated about 50 minutes northwest of La Rochelle and a similar distance from the beautiful Vendee beaches.

Geography
The river Smagne forms all of the commune's southern border.

See also
Communes of the Vendée department

References

Communes of Vendée